Bromochlorodifluoromethane (BCF), also referred to by the code numbers Halon 1211 and Freon 12B1, is a haloalkane with the chemical formula CF2ClBr.  It is used for fire suppression, especially for expensive equipment or items that could be damaged by the residue from other types of extinguishers.

Use as a fire extinguishing agent
Brominated haloalkanes were first used during World War II in fire extinguishers for aircraft and tanks. BCF was introduced as an effective gaseous fire suppression agent in the mid-1960s for use around highly valuable materials in places such as museums, mainframe rooms, and telecommunication switching centers. BCFs were also widely used in the maritime industries in the engine rooms of ships and also in the transport industry in vehicles. Its efficiency as a fire extinguishing agent has also led it to be the predominant choice of fire extinguishing agent on commercial aircraft and is typically found in cylindrical hand-held canisters. Its advantages as a fire extinguishing agent are that it has lower toxicity than chemicals such as carbon tetrachloride and that since it is a covalently bonded compound, it does not form conductive ions, therefore being usable on electrical equipment.

BCF is an excellent fire extinguishing agent, as it is a streaming agent with low toxicity, a low pressure, liquefied gas, and effective on all common types of fires, A, B, and C. It is mainly used in portable and wheeled extinguishers, and small spot protection units for aviation and marine engine applications, and was never widely used in fixed systems like Halon 1301 was.

BCF has fairly low toxicity. The lethal concentration for 15 minute exposure is about 32%.

Synthesis
BCF is commercially synthesized in a two-step process from chloroform.  Chloroform is fluorinated with hydrogen fluoride. The resulting chlorodifluoromethane is then reacted with elemental bromine at 400-600 °C, with reaction time limited to about 3 seconds. The overall yield is over 90%.

Regulation
The production of BCF and similar chlorofluorocarbons has been banned in most countries since January 1, 1994 as part of the Montreal Protocol on ozone depleting substances. However, recycling of Halon 1211 allows it to remain in use, although parts availability is limited to a few manufacturers and can be an issue. Halon 1211 is still widely used in the United States, despite its high cost, with the US military being the biggest user. Europe and Australia have banned its use for all but "critical applications" such as aviation, military, and police use.

The manufacture of UL Listed halon 1211 extinguishers was supposed to cease on October 2009.  The future listing is still in discussion. Halotron I, the replacement extinguishing agent, requires a larger volume to get the same ratings as 1211.

Gallery

See also
Bromochlorofluoromethane
Bromotrifluoromethane
Ozone depletion potential

References

External links

Aviation fire extinguisher requirements

Halomethanes
Fire suppression agents
Greenhouse gases
Aviation safety
Organobromides
Organochlorides
Organofluorides